The Nigar Award for Best Actress, also known as Nigar Public Film Award for Best Actress is an award constituted for the cinema of Pakistan to recognise contribution of a lead actress in Lollywood. Established in 1958 by Ilyas Rashidi, it is presented annually by Nigar magazine as part of its annual ceremony of Nigar Awards. The award ceremony takes place independently and is not associated with government or for-profit entities such as production house or television channel.

First presented in 1957, the first Best Actress award was given to Sabiha Khanum for Saat Lakh (1957). The last award was given to Saba Qamar in 2017 for Lahore Se Aagey.

Winners and nominees

1950s

1960s

1970s

1980s

1990s

2000s

References

Further reading 
 The Nigar Awards 1972 - 1986. The Hotspot Online.
 Showtime: A Brief History of the Nigar Awards. Youline Magazine.

Nigar Awards
Awards for actresses